Sanphet VIII or Suriyenthrathibodi (1661 – 1709) was the King of Ayutthaya from 1703 to 1709 and the second ruler of the Ban Phlu Luang Dynasty. Suriyenthrathibodi was also known by the noble title he held before ascending the throne, Luang Sorasak. He was the adopted son of Phetracha, the founder of the Ban Phlu Luang dynasty.

Early life
Born in Phichit Province, Ayutthaya Kingdom in 1661, Prince Ma Duea was the secret son of King Narai and his concubine Princess Kusawadi of Chiang Mai. Back then Kusawadi was already pregnant with him when Narai gave her to Phetracha to be his wife, Phetracha raised him as his own son.

At young age, he shown great interest in learning the art of the eight limbs, the forerunner to modern Muay Thai, under the tutelage of Ajahn Saeng, the son of the abbot of Mahathat, and would continually be involved in flight and brawls.

The "Revolution" of 1688

When King Narai was seriously ill with no hope of recovery, Phetracha arrested the King, his adopted son Phra Pi, and Constantine Phaulkon and the French officers on 18 May 1688. After questioning Phra Pi, he discovered Phra Pi had conspired with Phaulkon to assume the throne, and Phra Pi was executed on 20 May. Further questioning of Phaulkon revealed a plot to raise a rebellion, and he too was executed by Luang Sorasak on 5 June. Narai, on his deathbed, was unable to do anything, except cursing Luang Sorasak and his adoptive father Phetracha. Luang Sorasak then had Narai's two half-brothers, Prince Aphaithot and Prince Noi, executed.

Following the death of King Narai, Phetracha had proclaimed himself King, he appointed Luang Sorasak as the Prince Viceroy.

"Tiger King" 
After the death of his adoptive father Phetracha in 1703, Luang Sorasak triumphed over his younger half-brother Prince Khwan, another son of Phetracha with Princess Sisuphan, and was proclaimed as the new king. Despite the promise of giving up his throne to Prince Khwan when he reached certain age, Sorasak secretly had him executed, followed by his adoptive father's Chinese Okya Sombatthiban.

As king, he constructed Wat Pho Prathap Chang at the alleged site of his birth place, in Phichit Province.

The Siamese commoners in his time gave him the name Phra Chao Suea, ( "Tiger King"), for he was, according to the official chronicles, as evil as tiger. "Stories abound of his appalling private life and his acts of cruelty."  The Chronicle of Ayutthaya, Phan Chanthanumat (Choem)'s Edition, described his behaviour as follows:

"His Majesty habitually pleased himself with liquor and intercourse with the female children under 11-12 years of age. If any female was unable to endure him and writhed in pain, His Majesty would become furious and bestow a penalty upon her by crushing her to death with his feet. But if any female could maintain her tolerance without struggle, His Majesty would be elated and bestow upon her certain gratuities and rewards.

"Furthermore, when His Majesty took a trip to any canal, sea, island or any other place full of sharks, sawfish and other aquatic beings, he always drank liquor. If any concubine, lady, page or official caused his barge shaken, His Majesty would exercise no judgment and express no mercy, but would be enraged and order the person to be dragged with a hook and thrown into water to be consumed by sharks and sawfish.

"Moreover, His Majesty never maintained himself in the five precepts. He gratified himself by having intercourse with the wives of the government officers. From that time onwards, he was given the name the 'Tiger King'."

The Chronicle of Ayutthaya, British Museum's Version, also contained the like:

"At that time, the king was of vulgar mind, uncivil behaviour, savage conduct, cruel habit. He was never interested in charitable activities, but only in the activities which breached the royal traditions. Also, he lacked inhibition, but was consumed by unholy sin. Eternal were anger and ignorance in his mind. And the king habitually drank liquor and pleased himself by having intercourse with the female children not yet attaining the age of menstruation. In this respect, if any female was able to endure him, that female would be granted a great amount of rewards, money, gold, silks and other cloth. Should any female be incapable of bearing with him, he would be enraged and strike a sword at her heart, putting her to death. The caskets were every day seen to be called into the palace to contain the female dead bodies and to be brought out of the palace through a royal gate at the end of the royal confinement mansion. That gate thereby gained the name the 'Gate of Ghosts' until now."

Suriyenthrathibodi and Phan Thai Norasing 

Although Suriyenthrathibodi was given the name the "Tiger King", his desire to save the life of his wheelsman Phan Thai Norasing showed his compassionate side.

Issue

Ancestry

References 

1709 deaths
Kings of Ayutthaya
Ban Phlu Luang dynasty
Year of birth unknown
18th-century monarchs in Asia
17th-century Thai people
18th-century Thai people
18th-century Thai monarchs